Long Beach is one of the outer barrier islands off the south coast of Long Island, New York, United States. 
Long Beach is the westernmost of these barrier islands, fronting on Reynolds Channel to the north and the Atlantic Ocean to the south.

History 

The first inhabitants on the Long Beach Barrier Island were the Rockaway Indians; the island was sold to the New Netherland colonists in 1643. Local Long Island baymen and farmers used the island for fishing and harvesting salt hay; no people lived on the island year round for more than two centuries. The United States Congress established a lifesaving station in 1849, a dozen years after 62 people died when the barque Mexico carrying Irish immigrants to New York ran ashore on New Year's Day.

Development began on the island as a resort and was organized by Austin Corbin, a builder from Brooklyn, New York. Austin Corbin formed a partnership with the Long Island Rail Road to finance the New York and Long Beach Railroad Company which laid tracks from Lynbrook to Long Beach in 1880. The company also opened the  Long Beach Hotel, at the time the largest in the world. The railroad brought 300,000 visitors the first season. By the next spring, tracks had been laid almost the full length of the Long Beach Island, but after repeated winter storm washouts they were removed in 1894.

Communities

Cities 

 Long Beach

Villages 

 Atlantic Beach

Hamlets 

 East Atlantic Beach
 Lido Beach
 Point Lookout

Transportation

Road 

The Long Beach Bridge connects to Island Park, the Atlantic Beach Bridge connects to Lawrence on the mainland of Long Island, and the Loop Parkway bridge connects Lido Beach to the Meadowbrook State Parkway.

Rail 
The Long Island Rail Road's Long Beach Branch terminates at the Long Beach station on the island.

Bus 
Bus services are provided by Nassau Inter-County Express (NICE) and Long Beach Bus.

See also 

 Jones Beach Island
 Fire Island

References

Islands of Nassau County, New York
Landforms of Nassau County, New York